Edward Dawson may refer to:

 Edward Dawson (basketball) (1907–1998), Canadian Olympic basketball player
 Edward Dawson (politician) (1802–1859), English politician, MP for Leicestershire South 1832–1835
 Eddie Dawson (1904–1979), cricketer
 Eddie Dawson (footballer) (1913–1970), English football goalkeeper